Andrew Jordon Ditka Coe (born 8 April 1996) is a Canadian rugby union player who generally plays as a fullback representing Canada internationally. He also plays for Rugby New York (Ironworkers) in Major League Rugby (MLR). His nickname is "Cozy Bones".

He was included in the Canadian squad for the 2019 Rugby World Cup which is held in Japan for the first time and also marks his first World Cup appearance.

Career 
He made his international debut for Canada against Georgia on 10 June 2017. He was also part of the Canada rugby sevens team which took part at the 2018 Commonwealth Games. He made his first World Cup match appearance against Italy on 26 September 2019 and also scored a try in a losing cause for Canada, where Italy thrashed them in a one sided match by scoring 48–7.

In June 2021, Coe was named to Canada's 2020 Summer Olympics sevens team.

Club statistics

References 

1996 births
Living people
Canadian rugby union players
Canada international rugby union players
Rugby union fullbacks
Rugby sevens players at the 2018 Commonwealth Games
Commonwealth Games competitors for Canada
Sportspeople from Brampton
Rugby sevens players at the 2020 Summer Olympics
Olympic rugby sevens players of Canada
Rugby union centres
Rugby union wings
Rugby New York players